The English Shinty Team is the team selected to represent The English Shinty Association and the sport of shinty in England. It has competed at International level against the United States and Alba, but also competes in Scottish cup competitions at club level.

History 

The English Shinty Team was formed along with the English Shinty Association in 2013 to represent the association in fixtures.

They took on the USA in what was dubbed as the first ever Shinty International at St Andrews in 2013, winning 2–0.

Since then, The English Shinty Team have entered the Bullough Cup annually and played friendly matches when possible as noted below.

Eligibility Criteria 

Players are generally considered eligible to play for the ESA team if they are registered with one of the shinty clubs based in England and not playing with any other club at the time.  Most of the players are permanently resident in England, but there have been cases of players who have a historical link with England (often by birth or long residency in the country) and are not registered with another club registering and joining the team for matches.

Matches

In popular culture
The song "When you hear the lions' roar" is an ode to the English Shinty Team and makes reference to the dying out of shinty in England and its replacement with hockey.  It also makes reference to England's history and the difficulty some Scottish players have playing for the team.

See also
List of national sports teams of England

References

External links
 English Shinty Association

Shinty
Shinty